Government Sivagangai Medical College and Hospital was started in the year 2012-13 in the Sivagangai District with an annual intake of 100 students for MBBS Course. The college was approved by Medical Council Of India and it is affiliated to Tamil Nadu Dr. M.G.R. Medical University, Guindy, Chennai.

History 
Government Sivagangai Medical College & Hospital (GSMCH), Sivagangai  was started on 1 March 2012, where students are selected by merit by the Government. The College is recognized by the Medical Council Of India and it is affiliated to the Tamil Nadu Dr. M.G.R. Medical University, Guindy, Chennai.  This institution is located at Vaniyangudi village, Manamadurai road, about 4 km from the main town on the route to  Manamadurai. This is situated in a land of 30 acres and was built at a cost of 114 crores.

First Batch of 100 MBBS students were admitted in August 2012. The Hospital houses a 500 bedded ward to treat in-patients.

Government Sivagangai Medical College Hospital accommodates all the Broad speciality departments, Pre and para Clinical departments as per MCI norms.

This Hospital also has facilities such as advanced Operation Theatre facility, Emergency 24 hour Casualty, Trauma ward, Triage ward, in surgical field, Intensive Care Unit and Coronary Care Unit. Special facilities such as NICU, PICU wards have been established in  Pediatrics Speciality to bring down the paediatric Mortality rate.

Chief Minister's Comprehensive Health Insurance Scheme, 108 Ambulance facility are some of the special services rendered by this medical College Hospital.

Students are provided with hostel facilities and the staffs are provided with staff quarters.

Emblem 

The Official Emblem of the college has the Caduceus and the words Learn To Serve Poor.

Campus 
This institution is located in outskirts of Sivagangai Municipality near Vaniyangudi Village on the Manamadurai Highway. This is situated in a land of 30 acres and was built at a cost of 114 crores.

The college premises includes OP block, Casualty block, CEmONC block, Trauma & Emergency block, Administrative block, Faculty block, Auditorium, Central Library, Lecture Halls (3x120), Examination Hall (1x250), Blood Bank, Mortuary, Quarters for Dean, RMO, ARMO, Professors, Asst. Professors, Residents, Nurses and Staffs, Separate Hostels for Boys, Girls & CRRI, Gymnasium, Cooperative Store, Cafeteria, Bank and Gas plant.

Academics

Undergraduate Medical Course
MBBS (100 Seats / Year)

Postgraduate Medical Course
 MD General Medicine (6 Seats / Year)
 MD Pediatrics (3 Seats / Year)
 MD Anesthesia (4 Seats / Year)
 MD Emergency Medicine (5 Seats / Year)
 MS General Surgery (2 Seats / Year)
 MS Obstetrics & Gynaecology (6 Seats / Year)

Paramedical Courses
DMLT - Diploma in Medical Lab Technology - 100 Seats (2 Years) 
Operation theatre technician (1 Years) 100 Seats
Anesthesia technician (1 Years) 100 Seats

Organisation & Administration

Governance
 Dean  Dr.C.Revathy,MD
 Vice Principal - Dr. Sharmila Thilagavathy, MD
 Medical Superintendent -Dr.Balamurugan,MD

Departments  
 General Medicine
 Thoracic Medicine
 Neurology
 Urology
 Dermatology
 General Surgery
 Paediatrics
 Obstetrics & Gynacology
 Orthopaedics
 Psychiatric
 Anaesthesia
 Radiology
 Dental
 ENT
 Ophthalmology
 Community Medicine (SPM)
 Pharmacology
 Pathology
 Forensic Medicine
 Microbiology
 Anatomy
 Physiology
 Biochemistry

Student Life

Events 
 Convocation (Mar)
 Ignitra - Sports Event (Apr)
 Freshers Party (June)
 Hostel Day (Sep)
 Medcafe - Inter College Quiz (Oct)
 Colossus - CME
 Mephobia - Culturals (Oct)

Hostel 
 UG Men's Hostel - Knights' Yard
 UG Women's Hostel - Nightingales' Niche
 CRRI Quarters
 PG Hostels

Sports and activities 
 Cricket
 Volleyball
 Basketball
 Badminton
 Table tennis
 Chess
 Carrom
 Hockey
 Football

Batches 
 2012 - Kalos Medens
 2013 - Krenoviantzz
 2014 - Magnus Artsenz
 2015 - Argus Troezianz
 2016 - Alecto Xanthronz
 2017 - Xrdianz
 2018 - Zenforians
 2019 - Orpheus Titanz 
 2020 - Rhyzus Invictenz
 2021 -

External links
 Website
 Instagram
 Facebook
 YouTube
 The Tamil Nadu Dr. MGR Medical University

References 

Medical colleges in Tamil Nadu
Educational institutions established in 2012
2012 establishments in Tamil Nadu
Education in Sivaganga district